Sorin Tănasie (born June 8, 1980 in Craiova, Romania) is a professional bantamweight boxer.

Amateur highlights
As an amateur he claimed a bronze medal at the 2002 European Amateur Boxing Championships in Perm, Russia and a gold medal in 1998 Junior World Amateur Boxing Championships in Buenos Aires, Argentina.

References

1980 births
Bantamweight boxers

Living people
Sportspeople from Craiova
Romanian male boxers